Romualdas is a Lithuanian masculine given name.

List of people named Romualdas
Romualdas Aleliūnas (born 1960), Lithuanian designer of ceramics
Romualdas Brazauskas (born 1960), Lithuanian basketball referee
Romualdas Granauskas (1939-2014), author and dramaturge
Romualdas Krikščiūnas (1930-2010), apostolic administrator of the Roman Catholic Diocese 
Romualdas Lankauskas (born 1932), Lithuanian writer, playwright and painter
Romualdas Marcinkus (1907–1944), Lithuanian pilot 
Romualdas Murauskas (1934-1979), boxer from the Soviet Union 
Romualdas Ozolas (born 1939) is a Lithuanian politician, activist, writer and pedagogue
Romualdas Požerskis (b. 1951), Lithuanian photographer and a 1990 recipient of the Lithuanian National Prize 
Romualdas Rudzys (born 1947), Lithuanian politician
Romualdas Vinojinidis, Soviet sprint canoer who competed in the early 1970s

Masculine given names
Lithuanian masculine given names